Manuel Raygada Ballesteros (March 8, 1904 – April 5, 1971) was a poet and songwriter of Peruvian Musica criolla, best known for his often covered "Mi Perú" (My Peru). He was born in Callao.

Songs 
 Mi Perú
 Nostalgia Chalaca
 Mi Retorno
 Mechita
 Santa Rosa de Lima
 Así era Ella
 Acuarela Criolla
 Hilos de Plata

External links 
 Biography in Spanish
 Música Peruana

1904 births
1971 deaths
Peruvian composers
Peruvian male composers
People from Callao
20th-century composers
20th-century male musicians